Lesley Botha (born ) is a South African rugby union player for the . His regular position is centre.

Botha was named in the  squad for the 2021 Currie Cup Premier Division.

References

South African rugby union players
Living people
2001 births
Rugby union centres
Free State Cheetahs players
Cheetahs (rugby union) players
Rugby union fullbacks
Rugby union players from Bloemfontein